The Jiri River is a tributary of the Barak River in the Indian state of Assam. The river originates from Boro Ninglo area of Dima Hasao district. The Jiri river serves as the inter-state boundary between Manipur and Assam and joins the Barak River at Jirimukh (Jiri-mukh where mukh means mouth in Assamese language).

References 

Rivers of Assam
Rivers of India